The Black Gate is a 1919 American silent mystery film directed by Theodore Marston and starring Earle Williams, Ruth Clifford, Harry Spingler, J. Parks Jones, and Clarissa Selwynne. The film was released by Vitagraph Company of America in November 1919.

Plot

Cast
Earle Williams as Shaler Spencer
Ruth Clifford as Vera Hampton
Harry Spingler as Wade DeForrest
J. Parks Jones as Rod Spencer (as Park Jones)
Clarissa Selwynne as Mrs. DeForrest (as Clarissa Selwyn)
Brinsley Shaw as Norton
J. Barney Sherry as Bowen

Preservation
The film is now considered lost.

References

External links

1919 mystery films
American mystery films
1919 films
American silent feature films
American black-and-white films
Vitagraph Studios films
Lost American films
1919 lost films
Lost mystery films
Films directed by Theodore Marston
1910s American films
Silent mystery films